Botswana Squash Rackets Association is the national governing body for squash in Botswana.

External links
 Official site

See also
 Botswana men's national squash team

National members of the World Squash Federation
Squash in Botswana
Sports governing bodies in Botswana